Sahukara is a 2004 Indian Kannada-language film directed by Om Prakash Rao and produced by K. Manju. It stars V. Ravichandran, Rambha, Shashikumar and Anu Prabhakar. Veteran actor Vishnuvardhan made a special appearance. It was a remake of the Malayalam film Thenmavin Kombath (1994).

The film was released on 24 September 2004 to generally positive reviews from critics, went on to become one of the blockbuster hits of 2004, and successfully screened for about 25 weeks in cinema halls.

Cast
 V. Ravichandran as Muthu
 Vishnuvardhan as Sahukara (Special appearance)
 Rambha as Ranganayaki
 Shashikumar as Yajamana 
 Anu Prabhakar 
 Rangayana Raghu as Jamindar Benkiyappa
 Sumithra
 Dharma
Jolly Bastin 
Junior Narasimharaju 
Mandeep Rai 
Prakash Shenoy 
Sarigama Viji 
Bullet Prakash 
Tension Nagaraj 
Sridhar Raj 
Bhanu Prakash 
Om Prakash Rao in special appearance 
Honnavalli krishna 
Mohan Juneja 
 Tennis Krishna
 Ramesh Bhat
 Padmini
 Ashalatha
 Sundar Raj as Dhiwan
Shivaji Rao Jadhav

Production 
Vishnuvardhan said he accepted to work in the film "out of inspiration from Rajnikanth".
Principal photography began in June 1995 and took place in Mysore, Srirangapattana and Kerala. The film music composed by A. R. Rahman, with lyrics written by K.Kalyan.

Soundtrack
Rajesh Ramanath used all the tunes and re-arranged the instrumentation from the original soundtrack of Muthu composed by A. R. Rahman.

References

External source
 Sahukara review
 Deccan Herald review

2004 films
2000s Kannada-language films
Indian drama films
Kannada remakes of Malayalam films
Films scored by Rajesh Ramnath
Films directed by Om Prakash Rao
2004 drama films